The R335 road is a regional road in counties Mayo and Galway in Ireland. It starts in Westport, County Mayo and ends in Leenaun, County Galway. The N59 is a much more direct route between the two towns. The R335 passes through Murrisk (where Croagh Patrick is located), Lecanvey, Louisburgh and Delphi before terminating in Leenaun.

See also
List of roads of County Mayo
National primary road
National secondary road
Roads in Ireland

References

External links
Roads Act 1993 (Classification of Regional Roads) Order 2006 – Department of Transport

Regional roads in the Republic of Ireland
Roads in County Galway
Roads in County Mayo